The 2015 United Football League was the sixth season of the UFL since its establishment as a semi-professional league in 2009. Ten teams competed in UFL Division 1 while seven teams were in Division 2.

Global were the defending champions, having won the Division 1 of the 2014 United Football League season.

Ceres outclassed Team Socceroo 6-0 on 15 July 2015 to clinch the 2015 United Football League title with two games to spare.

Season summary

UFL Division 1 headlined a complete 10-team cast for the highest level of Philippine League football. Ceres and Manila Jeepney played in Division I, replacing the relegated Pasargad and the spot left by Manila Nomads' last season.

UFL Division 2 only had seven participants with new side Kabuscorp and returnees Mendiola. Six Division 2 clubs, namely, Philippine Air Force, Manila Nomads, UIM, Philippine Navy, Dolphins United, Cimarron,  participated in the 2015 UFL League competitions.

Division 1

Clubs

Managerial changes

Venues

League table

Results

Division 2

Clubs

Venues

League table

Results

Promotion-relegation playoffs
Team Socceroo, the 9th-placed team of Division 1 faced the 2nd-placed 2015 UFL Division 2 side JP Voltes in a two-legged playoff. The winner on aggregate score after both matches will earn a spot in the 2016 UFL Division 1.

1st Leg

2nd Leg

JP Voltes won 12–1 on aggregate and earned a United Football League Division 1 spot for the 2016 season.

Top goalscorers

Division 1

Correct as of 22:30, 5 August 2015
Source: uflph.com

Division 2

Correct as of 23:00, 18 July 2015
Source: uflph.com

Hat-tricks

 ‡ Player scored more than three goals

Correct as of 22:00, 29 July 2015
Source: uflph.com

Discipline

Division 1
 Most yellow cards (club): 26
 Philippine Army
 Least yellow cards (club): 10
 Pachanga Diliman
 Most yellow cards (player): 5
 Ronel Gener (Philippine Army)
 Most red cards (club): 2
 Philippine ArmyXY
 Team SoccerooXY
 Least red cards (club): 0
 Pachanga Diliman
 Stallion
 Most red cards (player): 1
 Jalsor Soriano (Ceres)Y
 William Herve Ebanda (Green Archers United)Y
 Jorge Butron (Kaya)Y
 Joo Young Lee (Loyola)Y
 Dexter Chio (Manila Jeepney)X
 Erwin Silvestre (Philippine Army)Y
 Lauren Bedua (Philippine Army)X
 Arnes Casil (Team Socceroo)Y
 Rogie Maglinas (Team Socceroo)X
 Most red cards (Team Management): 1
 Jorge Kuriyama (Global GK Coach)X
Note: X means Straight Red Card; Y means 2 Yellow Cards

Correct as of 22:30, 18 April 2015
Source: UFL Philippines

Division 2
 Most yellow cards (club): -
 Most yellow card (player): -
 Most red cards (club): -
 Most red cards (player): -

Correct as of__:__, __ __ 2015
Source: UFL Philippines

Cards and suspension

Division 1

Correct as of 22:30, 18 April 2015
Source: UFL Philippines

References

External links
Official website

 
United Football League (Philippines) seasons
1
Phil
Phil